A Rusical (portmanteau of "RuPaul" and "musical") is a musical production on the television series RuPaul's Drag Race. The productions have been featured on the series since season 6, and have been described by Cordu Krubally of Screen Rant as "a highly anticipated staple" of the show, allowing contestants to showcase their talents.

Rusicals by series

RuPaul's Drag Race

RuPaul's Drag Race All Stars

RuPaul's Secret Celebrity Drag Race

Canada's Drag Race

Drag Race España

Drag Race Holland

Drag Race Italia

Drag Race Thailand

RuPaul's Drag Race UK

RuPaul's Drag Race: UK vs the World

Drag Race Philippines

References

Drag Race (franchise)
Musicals